The Dzierżęcinka [ipa: /d͡ʑjɛrʐɛ̃t͡ɕiŋka/]' is a river in Poland with a length of 29.30 km, located in Koszalin County in the West Pomeranian Voivodeship. Rising in nearby Manowo, the Dzierżęcinka flows through Koszalin and eventually reaches Jamno lagoon to the north.

Rivers of Poland
Rivers of West Pomeranian Voivodeship